Colleen Bolton (born 19 March 1957) is an Australian cross-country skier. She competed in two events at the 1980 Winter Olympics.

References

External links
 

1957 births
Living people
Australian female cross-country skiers
Olympic cross-country skiers of Australia
Cross-country skiers at the 1980 Winter Olympics
Place of birth missing (living people)